During the Roman Empire, the governor of Roman Egypt (praefectus Aegypti) was a prefect who administered the Roman province of Egypt with the delegated authority (imperium) of the emperor.

Egypt was established as a Roman province in consequence of the Battle of Actium, where Cleopatra as the last independent ruler of Egypt and her Roman ally Mark Antony were defeated by Octavian, the adopted heir of the assassinated Roman dictator Julius Caesar. Octavian then rose to supreme power with the title Augustus, ending the era of the Roman Republic and installing himself as princeps, the so-called "leading citizen" of Rome who in fact acted as an autocratic ruler. Although senators continued to serve as governors of most other provinces (the senatorial provinces), especially those annexed under the Republic, the role of Egypt during the civil war with Antony and its strategic and economic importance prompted Augustus to ensure that no rival could secure Aegyptus as an asset. He thus established Egypt as an imperial province, to be governed by a prefect he appointed from men of the equestrian order.

As Egypt was a special imperial domain, a rich and strategic granary, where the Emperor enjoyed an almost pharaonic position unlike any other province or diocese, its head was styled uniquely Praefectus Augustalis, indicating that he governed in the personal name of the emperor, the "Augustus". The praefectus Aegypti was considered to hold the highest ranking equestrian post during the early empire. Later, the post would fall second to that of the praetorian command, but its position remained highly prestigious.

A prefect of Egypt usually held the office for three or four years. An equestrian appointed to the office received no specialized training, and seems to have been chosen for his military experience and knowledge of Roman law and administration. Any knowledge he might have of Egypt and its arcane traditions of politics and bureaucracy—which Philo of Alexandria described as "intricate and diversified, hardly grasped even by those who have made a business of studying them from their earliest years"—was incidental to his record of Roman service and the emperor's favor.

Prefects during the Principate
Unless otherwise noted, governors from 30 BC to AD 299 are taken from Guido Bastianini, "Lista dei prefetti d'Egitto dal 30a al 299p", Zeitschrift für Papyrologie und Epigraphik, 17 (1975), pp. 263-321, 323-328

Later Roman Diocese (330 – 395)
Prefects of the province of Egypt. Names and dates taken from the Prosopography of the Later Roman Empire, vol. 1, pp. 1084–1085.

First Byzantine Period (395 – 616)
Names and dates taken from John Stewart's African States and Rulers (2006).

Titles:
Prefect (395 - 539)
Dux (539 - 616)

Sassanian Occupation

Second Byzantine Period (628-642)

References

Further reading
 Heinz Hübner: Der Praefectus Aegypti von Diokletian bis zum Ende der römischen Herrschaft. Filser, München-Pasing 1952.
 Oscar William Reinmuth: The Prefect of Egypt from Augustus to Diocletian. Leipzig 1935.
 Arthur Stein: Die Präfekten von Ägypten in der römischen Kaiserzeit. Francke, Bern 1950.

 
Roman Egypt
Egypt
Roman governors
Egypt
Byzantine Egypt